Beth Torbert is a Canadian singer best known by her stage name Bif Naked. Between 1996 and 2016, she was among the top 150 selling Canadian artists in Canada.

Early life and education
Bif Naked was born in New Delhi, India, to teenage parents attending private school. She was subsequently adopted by American missionaries. She spent part of her childhood in Lexington, Kentucky, where her father was a professor at the University of Kentucky. She went to Kelsey Elementary School in The Pas, Manitoba, for a couple of years. After living for a time in Dauphin, Manitoba, her family eventually settled in Winnipeg. She graduated from John Taylor Collegiate and studied theatre at the University of Winnipeg. After University, she began pursuing a career as a stand-up comic.

The name "Bif" started as a nickname based on the mispronunciation of her real name, Beth.

Career
After spending several years singing with several underground bands, Bif Naked independently released a self-titled solo album, Bif Naked, in 1994, and I Bificus in 1998. In 1999 she toured across Canada.

Another solo album, Purge was released in 2001. She also released a spoken word album called Okenspay Ordway: Things I Forgot To Tell Mommy. In 2005, after narrowing it down from over fifty songs, she released Superbeautifulmonster, which featured thirteen tracks. The Promise, which was recorded while Bif was undergoing chemotherapy for breast cancer, was released in 2009 and was dedicated to her fans. The album featured tracks mixed by Juno Award winner Mike Fraser. In 2011, after doing acoustic sets on tour, Bif released an acoustic record on Her Royal Majesty's Records late-2013, featuring acoustic versions of her past songs as well as four previously unreleased tracks. The album is entitled BIF NAKED FOREVER: Acoustic Hits and Other Delights. Bif has also been involved on a side project, Jakkarta.

Prior to her solo career, Torbert played with punk bands Gorilla Gorilla and Chrome Dog. She has toured Europe, the United States, and Canada as a headlining act, and has performed on bills with: Snoop Dogg, Billy Idol, Dido, Devin Townsend, Sarah McLachlan, Sheryl Crow, Chrissie Hynde, Foo Fighters, The Cult, Prodigy, Smashing Pumpkins, Ministry, Green Day, and many more.

Bif's music has been featured in and on soundtracks for shows including Buffy the Vampire Slayer, Charmed, Moonlight, The Crow: Stairway to Heaven, Ready To Rumble, The West Wing and Celebrity Deathmatch. She recorded a rendition of the Christmas classic, "I Saw Mommy Kissing Santa Claus" for MTV's Total Request Live CD MTV: TRL Christmas in 1999 and was also featured on the Ready to Rumble soundtrack with a cover of Twisted Sister's "We're Not Gonna Take It". (which was additionally used as David Arquette's entrance theme while he was on WCW Monday Nitro). The song "Dawn", taken from Purge, was featured in the film American Psycho 2, starring Mila Kunis and William Shatner.

She made a guest appearance in the song "Fucker", on Strapping Young Lad's album The New Black in 2006. Bif Naked has also made guest appearances with artists such as SNFU on the songs "One Last Loveshove" and "You Make Me Thick". She also appeared on the Dead Celebrity Status album Blood Music on the track titled "In This Day and Age". In 2011, she recorded a duet with Vancouver-based yogi and Nettwerk recording artist Will Blunderfield for the international version of his album Hallelujah.

Bif Naked has also appeared in music videos for other artists including: The Offspring's "The Kids Aren't Alright", "Believe Me" and "Silver" by Moist and Liveonrelease's "Get with It." In 2009, she appeared in the video for Simple Plan's "Save You" near the end along with other people (such as Sharon Osbourne and René Angélil) who have survived or have been treated for cancer.

Aside from her music career, Bif has also pursued acting. In 1990, she appeared in the film Archangel, where she was credited as "Bif Torbert," playing a Russian soldier. In 1997, she played a liquor store manager in The Boys Club. She appeared in the television series Once a Thief in 1998, playing Nastassja Momomame. In 2000, she voiced the character Alison in the Daria movie, Is It Fall Yet?, playing a bisexual art camp attendee who attempts to seduce Jane Lane. She appeared in the Canadian indie films Lunch with Charles (2001) and Crossing (2005), the latter of which she recorded the song "My Greatest Masterpiece" for. She has done hosting work for the CBC Television series ZeD (becoming their first host in 2002), and for Bodog, hosting Bodog Fight in 2006 as well as a reality series chronicling the days leading up to her marriage with Vancouver Sun sports writer, Ian Walker, in 2007 called Bif Naked Bride. She voiced the character Zoe Payne in the SSX video game series and Sled Storm. In 2003, she made a cameo appearance in the zombie horror film The House of the Dead. That same year, she appeared as a judge of a fictitious reality show in the TV series Cold Squad. In 2006, she guest starred on an episode of The L Word, playing a character named Cynthia. In addition, Bif Naked has appeared as herself in Buffy the Vampire Slayer, The Crow: Stairway to Heaven and The Chris Isaak Show. Bif Naked also narrated the TV series That's Art?! (2012).

In 2021, Bif appeared as a guest judge on an episode of the second season of Canada's Drag Race.

Personal life

She is heavily tattooed, getting her first tattoo (an Egyptian Eye of Horus) when she was sixteen years old. Her tattoos include: a symbol of the Tao, Japanese writing, Buddhist poetry and images (such as the Bodhisattva), and Hindu imagery; she has stated on MTV that her favorite tattoo, on her left arm, reads "Survivor." Bif identifies as poly amorous pan sexual. She is also a comic cartoonist

Her first marriage, which lasted six months, was to her drummer Brett Hopkins in Gorilla Gorilla. She then married former Vancouver Sun sports writer Ian Walker in 2007; they divorced in 2011.

In January 2008, she announced that she had been diagnosed with breast cancer, and underwent a lumpectomy and chemotherapy.

Bif Naked spoke at the University of the Fraser Valley for International Women's Day on March 8, 2013, at the Abbotsford campus; it was announced she would be awarded an honorary doctorate from the university in June 2013.

In 2015, she became engaged to Steve Allen, a friend of her former bandmate Jacen Ekstrom. They married on July 30, 2016 and separated in 2022.

Bif is a vegan.

Band membership

Current band members
Bif Naked – vocals, background vocals
Doug Fury – guitar
Chiko Misomali – drums, background vocals
 Peter Karroll – bass

Past members
 Steve Allen - Guitar
 Ferdy Belland - Bass
 Alley Artico – Guitar
 Alex Arundel aka XFactor (aka Gene Poole, co-writer of "Chotee") – guitar
 Kuryakin – synths and bass backup vocals
 Corrine Culbertson CoCo – bass
 Mike Sage – drums
 Doug Fury (now in Scatterheart) – guitar, bass, co-writer and co-producer
 Gail Greenwood (Belly/L7) – bass
 Scotty McCarger – drums
 Chris Crippin (Everything After/Hedley) – drums
 Randy Black (Annihilator) – drums
 Jacen Ekstrom (Neurosonic/CrashScene) – bass (deceased)
 John Bates (Big John Bates) - guitar
 Gillian Hanna – guitar (deceased)
 Britt Black – guitar
 Rich Priske – bass (deceased)
 Scott Cooke – bass
 Tim Smyth – bass
 Greg Mark (Juno-nominated Vancouver psychedelic pop band Templar) – guitar
 Sean Stubbs – drums
 Adam (ATOM) Percy (Econoline Crush) – keyboards
 Dan Yaremko (Econoline Crush)/(D.O.A.) – bass
 Lamar Engel – (vocalist/musician for art rock band An Opiate for Angels) – bass
 Dave Martone – bass
 Gabe Cipes – bass
 Joe Veltri – bass

Discography

Studio albums
Bif Naked – 1994
I Bificus – 1998 (CRIA – Platinum)
Purge – 2001 (CRIA – Gold)
Superbeautifulmonster – 2005 (#12 CAN)
The Promise – 2009 (#30 CAN)
Champion – 2023

EPs and compilations
Four Songs and a Poem – 1994
Okenspay Ordway: Things I Forgot to Tell Mommy – 1997
Another 5 Songs and a Poem – 2000
Essentially Naked – 2003
Bif Naked Forever: Acoustic Hits & Other Delights – 2012

Singles

Music videos
"Everything" (1994)
"My Whole Life"
"Tell on You"
"Never Alone"
"Daddy's Getting Married" (directed by William Morrison 1996)
"Spaceman"
"Lucky" (co-directed by Peter Karroll)
"Moment of Weakness" (1999) (directed by Marcos Siega)
"We're Not Gonna Take It"
"Chotee"
"Twitch" (1999) (directed by Peter Karroll)
"I Love Myself Today"
"Tango Shoes" (directed by Neill Blomkamp (District 9 / Chappie)
"Choking in the Truth"  (directed by Neill Blomkamp (District 9 / Chappie)
"Back in the Day" (co-directed by Peter Karroll)
"Rich and Filthy" 
"Let Down" (directed by Peter Karroll)
"Nothing Else Matters"
"Everyday" (directed by Peter Karroll)
"My Greatest Masterpiece" (2007)
"Fuck You 2" (2009)
"Sick" (2009)
"King of Karma" (2009)
"Only One" 2016 directed by Coco Karroll
"Heavy" 2018 directed by Peter Karroll
"Jim" (2020)

See also

Canadian rock
Music of Canada

References

External links

Bodog Music record label

 

Living people
Bisexual actresses
Bisexual singers
People from Delhi
Indian rock musicians
University of Winnipeg alumni
Canadian adoptees
Canadian indie rock musicians
Canadian punk rock singers
Canadian video game actresses
Canadian voice actresses
Canadian women rock singers
Women punk rock singers
Actresses from Winnipeg
Musicians from Winnipeg
Writers from Winnipeg
Canadian LGBT singers
Canadian LGBT songwriters
Canadian LGBT actors
Bisexual songwriters
20th-century Canadian actresses
21st-century Canadian actresses
20th-century Canadian women singers
21st-century Canadian women singers
20th-century Canadian guitarists
21st-century Canadian guitarists
20th-century Canadian bass guitarists
21st-century Canadian bass guitarists
Canadian people of Indian descent
People from The Pas
People from Dauphin, Manitoba
20th-century Canadian LGBT people
21st-century Canadian LGBT people
Year of birth missing (living people)
20th-century women guitarists
21st-century women guitarists
Canadian bisexual writers